Ó Siochfhradha is an Irish surname. It may refer to:
 Mícheál Ó Siochfhradha (1900–1986), Irish language writer and storyteller
 Pádraig Ó Siochfhradha (1883–1964), activist, writer (under the pen name An Seabhac) and senator